Martine Pascal (born 27 January 1939) is a French theatre, cinema, and television actress. She is the daughter of actress Gisèle Casadesus (1914–2017) and actor Lucien Pascal (1906–2006). Pascal was married to American-born French production designer and art director Willy Holt with whom she has two children Natalie Holt and Oliver Holt.

See also 
Casadesus

References

External links 
 
 The Casadesus Family

1939 births
Living people
Actresses from Paris
French stage actresses
French film actresses
French television actresses
20th-century French actresses
21st-century French actresses
Casadesus family